Denizen Hotels is a former proposed brand within the Hilton Family of hotels.  Hilton targeted the brand to mark the company's entry into the global lifestyle brand sector, and introduced it on March 10, 2009, in Berlin, Germany. However, due to legal action by a competitor, Denizen's development was halted and the brand was dropped. Hilton announced its Canopy by Hilton lifestyle brand in October 2014.

Lawsuit 
In April 2009, Starwood filed suit against Hilton and its Denizen brand, accusing two former Starwood executives including Ross Klein, the former president of Starwood Hotels of stealing and taking trade secrets to Hilton for the development of the new brand. Hilton suspended development of the Denizen brand and placed the team on paid administrative leave. On April 24, 2009, a US district judge enjoined Starwood and ordered Hilton to stop development of its brand pending further investigation of corporate espionage.

In December 2010, Hilton Worldwide agreed to settle the lawsuit with Starwood. Though full terms were confidential, part included a $75 million cash payment from Hilton and another $75 million in hotel-management contracts. In addition, Hilton was subjected to an injunction that prohibited the hotel chain from introducing any lifestyle hotels for two years. Two court-appointed monitors supervised Hilton’s operations to ensure it complied with the injunction.

References 

Defunct hotel chains
Hilton Worldwide
Defunct companies based in Virginia